Drymobius is a genus of colubrid snakes commonly referred to as neotropical racers, which are endemic to the Americas. There are four species recognized in the genus.

Geographic range
They are found predominantly in Mexico and Central America, but they range as far north as the southern tip of Texas in the United States, and as far south as Brazil in South America.

Description 
Their coloration and pattern vary widely among species.

Habitat
They are found in areas of heavy vegetation, almost always near a permanent water source.

Behaviour
Drymobius are diurnal species. They are fast moving, and do not generally hesitate to bite if handled.

Diet
Their primary diet consists of frogs and toads.

Reproduction
Breeding occurs in the spring, and clutches of 6-8 eggs are laid in the early summer. The eggs hatch in approximately two months.

Species & Subspecies

 Drymobius chloroticus (Cope, 1886) - green highland racer - Mexico, Belize, Honduras, Guatemala, El Salvador, Nicaragua, and Costa Rica.
 Drymobius margaritiferus (Schlegel, 1837) - speckled racer - United States (Texas), Mexico, Panama, Guatemala, Honduras, Belize, El Salvador, Nicaragua, Costa Rica, and Colombia.
Drymobius margaritiferus margaritiferus (Schlegel, 1837) - southern Texas, Mexico
Drymobius margaritiferus fistulosus H.M. Smith, 1942 - Mexico
Drymobius margaritiferus maydis Villa, 1968 - Nicaragua
Drymobius margaritiferus occidentalis Bocourt, 1890 - Guatemala
 Drymobius melanotropis (Cope, 1876) - black forest racer - Honduras, Nicaragua, Costa Rica, and Panama.
 Drymobius rhombifer (Günther, 1860) - Esmarald racer - Nicaragua, Costa Rica, Panama, Colombia, Venezuela, French Guiana, Ecuador, Bolivia, Peru, and Brazil.

References 

Herps of Texas: Drymobius margaritiferus

Colubrids
Snake genera
Taxa named by Leopold Fitzinger